The Bridge of the Exposición Regional Valenciana 1909 was a bridge built in 1909 on the occasion of the celebration of the Valencia Regional Exhibition of 1909, specifically was inaugurated May 22, 1909 and takes its name from the aforementioned exhibition. It was a bridge of reinforced concrete (the first of this material constructed in the city), but unfortunately it was destroyed on October 14, 1957 in the flood of the Turia of that year. It was designed by the engineer José Aubán and was decorated with art-deco and modernisme elements. Instead was rise another bridge or rather an unsight gateway that finally late 20th century between 1991 and 1995 has been replaced by the current bridge by Santiago Calatrava and some known as the  La Peineta.

References

Demolished buildings and structures in Valencia
Art Nouveau architecture in the Valencian Community
Bridges completed in 1909
Bridges in the Valencian Community
World's fair architecture in Valencia
Demolished bridges
Buildings and structures demolished in 1957
1957 disestablishments in Spain
Buildings and structures destroyed by flooding